Miika Heikkilä (born 7 February 1992) is a Finnish ice hockey player. He is currently playing with Tappara in the Finnish Liiga.

Heikkilä made his Liiga debut playing with Lahti Pelicans during the 2014–15 Liiga season.

References

External links

1992 births
Living people
Finnish ice hockey forwards
Lahti Pelicans players
Tappara players
People from Loppi
Sportspeople from Kanta-Häme